Maamaankam is a 1979 Indian Malayalam-language historical drama film directed and produced by Navodaya Appachan, made under Navodaya Studio. It is based on the medieval Mamankam festival held every 12 years at the banks of river Bharathappuzha in Tirunavaya, Southern India. Written by N. Govindankutty, the film stars Prem Nazir, Jayan, Jose Prakash and Alummoodan in the lead roles. The film has musical score by K. Raghavan.

Plot
It is Chanthunni's greatest wish to go to the Mamankam and fight for the sake of his King Valluvakonathiri against the Samoothiri. However his uncle and guru wishes him to wait until the next Mamankam. And his childhood love Manka is the daughter of the Chief Minister of Samuthiri. Aiding Chanthunni is his best friend Moosa, who is also his uncle's disciple. Moosa captures Koya, a spy from the Samoothiri's camp, but is promptly tricked and captured by a rescue team led by Suhara, Koya's daughter. Suhara falls in love with Moosa while he's a prisoner. But her divided loyalties between her lover and her father may spell doom for either one of them. And Chanthunni has no intention of obeying his uncle to wait for another 12 years for the next Mamankam.

Cast
 
Prem Nazir as Chanthunni
Jayan as Moosa
Jose Prakash Manavikraman
Alummoodan 
Ambika as Manipennu
Kaviyoor Ponnamma as Chanthunni's mother 
Balan K. Nair 
Ceylon Manohar as Komappan
K. R. Vijaya  as Manka
Poojappura Ravi as Zamorin's Warrior
Bhavani as Suhara 
Kaduvakulam Antony as Velappan
M. N. Nambiar as Thanayanjeri Pandhya Perumal
Cochin Haneefa as Vellodi
Sukumari as Cherutti
G. K. Pillai as Thrithalakkal Gurukkal
Nellikode Bhaskaran as Koya

Soundtrack
The music was composed by K. Raghavan and the lyrics were written by P. Bhaskaran.

References

External links
 

1979 films
1970s Malayalam-language films
Films directed by Navodaya Appachan
Films produced by Navodaya Appachan